Alivaltiosihteeri valvoo (The Undersecretary of State oversees) is a 6-part Finnish television series by Yle. It aired on Finnish TV in 1994 and 1995. The series features the members of the band Alivaltiosihteeri, Simo Frangén, Pasi Heikura, Jyrki Liikka and Matti Toivonen.

The episodes all have distinct themes, with the cast taking roles such as the police, doctors, or amusement park employees. The main premise of the show has the cast commenting on sketches they watch from surveillance screens at work.

Cast
Simo Frangén
Pasi Heikura
Jyrki Liikka
Matti Toivone

See also
List of Finnish television series

External links
 

Finnish television shows
1994 Finnish television series debuts
1995 Finnish television series endings
1990s Finnish television series
Yle original programming